Xysticus luctuosus is a species of crab spider in the family Thomisidae. It is found in North America, Europe, Turkey, Caucasus, a range from Russia (European to Far East), and Kazakhstan.

References

Thomisidae
Articles created by Qbugbot
Spiders described in 1836